The eighth legislative assembly election for Tamil Nadu was held on 24 December 1984. All India Anna Dravida Munnetra Kazhagam (AIADMK) won the election and its general secretary, incumbent M. G. Ramachandran (M.G.R) was sworn in as Chief Minister, for the third time. The election victory was mainly attributed to the sympathy wave created by Indira Gandhi's assassination and M.G.R's illness coupled with Rajiv Gandhi's popularity. This is the last election M.G.R contested as he died in office in 1987. This is also the only General Election which M. Karunanidhi did not contest since 1957 until his death.

Background 
Indira Gandhi was assassinated on 31 October 1984. During the same time, M. G. Ramachandran was diagnosed with kidney failure and admitted in a hospital in New York City. Rajiv Gandhi assumed office immediately. Rajiv Gandhi felt that his Government required a fresh mandate from the people, and dissolved the Lok Sabha a year before its actual end of term, for fresh general elections. At the same time, Chief minister of Tamilnadu, M.G.R recommended dissolution of Tamil Nadu State Assembly a year ahead of end of term, to use the sympathy wave of Congress, and also check his popularity. Indian National Congress (Indira) and All India Anna Dravida Munnetra Kazhagam formed an alliance and  contested both general elections.

Parties 
National parties Bharatiya Janta Party, Communist Party of India, Communist Party of India (Marxist), Indian National Congress and Janata Party, state parties All India Anna Dravida Munnetra Kazhagam, Dravida Munnetra Kazhagam, Indian Congress (J), and registered unrecognised parties Ambedkar Kranti Dal, Gandhi Kamaraj National and Tamil Nadu Congress (K) contested the election.

Seat allocation 
The allocation of seats were done what was later dubbed, "The M.G.R formula". Where the regional party would contest 70% of the assembly seats and the national party would be given 70% of the Lok Sabha seats.
This would be the last election M.G.R contested, due to his death during his chief ministership.

Campaigning 
M. G. Ramachandran was confined to the hospital. Video coverage of M.G.R recuperating in hospital along with Indira Gandhi's assassination were stitched together by AIADMK man in charge of campaigning R. M. Veerappan. The video was distributed and played across all over Tamil Nadu. Rajiv Gandhi visited cyclone-hit areas in Tamil Nadu which also boosted the alliance. The sympathy wave created by Indira's assassination, M.G.R's illness and Rajiv Gandhi's charisma helped the alliance sweep the election. DMK leader M. Karunanidhi did not contest this election, due to the fact that the AIADMK founder M.G.R was admitted to a hospital in the U.S. and Indira Gandhi being assassinated.

Seat allotments

AIADMK Front

DMK Front

Voting and results

Results by Pre-Poll Alliance 

|-
! style="background-color:#E9E9E9;text-align:left;vertical-align:top;" |Alliance/Party
!style="width:4px" |
! style="background-color:#E9E9E9;text-align:right;" |Seats won
! style="background-color:#E9E9E9;text-align:right;" |Change
! style="background-color:#E9E9E9;text-align:right;" |Popular Vote
! style="background-color:#E9E9E9;text-align:right;" |Vote %
! style="background-color:#E9E9E9;text-align:right;" |Adj. %‡
|-
! style="background-color:#009900; color:white"|AIADMK+ alliance
! style="background-color:" | 
| 195
| +29
| 11,681,221
| style="text-align:center;vertical-align:middle;" colspan=2 | 53.9%
|-
|AIADMK
! style="background-color:" | 
| 132
| +3
| 8,030,809
| 37.0%
| 54.3%
|-
|INC
! style="background-color:" | 
| 61
| +30
| 3,529,708
| 16.3%
| 54.5%
|-
|GKC
! style="background-color: teal" |
| 2
| -4
| 120,704
| 0.6%
| 40.4%
|-
! style="background-color:#FF0000; color:white"|DMK+ alliance
! style="background-color: " |
| 34
| -25
| 8,021,293
| style="text-align:center;vertical-align:middle;" colspan=2 | 37.0%
|-
|DMK
! style="background-color: " |
| 24
| -13
| 6,362,770
| 29.3%
| 40.8%
|-
|CPI(M)
! style="background-color: " |
| 5
| -6
| 597,622
| 2.8%
| 39.6%
|-
|JNP
! style="background-color: " |
| 3
| +1
| 493,374
| 2.3%
| 36.4%
|-
|CPI
! style="background-color: " |
| 2
| -7
| 567,527
| 2.6%
| 35.5%
|-
! style="background-color:gray; color:white"|Others
! style="background-color:gray" |
| 5
| -4
| 1,983,959
| style="text-align:center;vertical-align:middle;" colspan=2 | 9.1%
|-
|IND
! style="background-color: " |
| 4
| -4
| 1,619,921
| 7.5%
| 7.9%
|-
|AKD
! style="background-color:"|
| 1
| –
| 47,212
| 0.7%
| 57.2%
|-
|TNC
! style="background-color: " |
| 0
| –
| 152,315
| 0.7%
| 34.9%
|-
|ICJ
! style="background-color:"|
| 0
| –
| 110,121
| 0.5%
| 3.2%
|-
|BJP
! style="background-color:"|
| 0
| –
| 54,390
| 0.3%
| 3.7%
|-
! style="text-align:center;" |Total
! style="background-color: " |
! 234
! –
! 21,686,473
! 100%
! style="text-align:center;" | –
|-
|}
‡: Vote % reflects the percentage of votes the party received compared to the entire electorate that voted in this election. Adjusted (Adj.) Vote %, reflects the % of votes the party received per constituency that they contested.
Sources: Election Commission of India

By constituency

M.G.R's third cabinet

After the General Elections held in December 1984, the Governor appointed Dr. M. G. Ramachandran as Chief Minister heading the new Government with effect from the forenoon of 10 February 1985. The Governor, on the advice of Hon. Chief Minister appointed 16 more Ministers on 14 February 1985.

Janaki's cabinet
 After MGR's death, VR Neduncheziyan was sworn in as Acting Chief Minister. But, one week later, the party majority led by R.M.Veerappan supported MGR's widow Janaki to become Chief minister and she was sworn in as Chief minister. Janaki doubled as the finance minister in her Cabinet. The Governor gave V. N. Janaki Ramachandran 30 days time to prove majority support in the house. This was a problem because, 30 MLAs of her own party were supporting J. Jayalalithaa to become the new Chief minister. Hence Janaki had the support of only 105 MLAs in the house of 234, as VR Neduncheziyan's 10 supporters chose to remain neutral and boycott the voting.

Hence, on the day of voting, Speaker PH pandiyan disqualified and dismissed 20 MLAs of opposition party DMK and 15 MLAs of AIADMK (Jayalalithaa faction ) from their MLA posts, due to demeaning behaviour in the house and thus announced that the majority was reduced to a mere 100, as the house then had only 199 members.

Before commencement of oral voting, violence erupted in the house and the speaker was injured. With bleeding head, he announced that Janaki had proved her majority with 105 MLAs and adjourned the house immediately. Then the members of the assembly were escorted out.

The Governor of state refused to accept this voting which was done under suspicious environment and recommended the Central government to dismiss the legislature and hold fresh general elections. The central government accepted the recommendation and the legislature was dissolved by the President.

See also 
Elections in Tamil Nadu
Legislature of Tamil Nadu
Government of Tamil Nadu

Footnotes

External links
 Election Commission of India

State Assembly elections in Tamil Nadu
1980s in Tamil Nadu
Tamil Nadu